Sympistis amenthes is a moth of the family Noctuidae first described by James T. Troubridge in 2008.

Adults are on wing in September.

References

amenthes
Moths described in 2008